The women's 200 metres at the 2021 World Athletics U20 Championships was held at the Kasarani Stadium on 20 and 21 August.

Records

Results

Heats
Qualification: First 4 of each heat (Q) and the 4 fastest times (q) qualified for the semifinals.

Wind:Heat 1: +0.2 m/s, Heat 2: +0.2 m/s, Heat 3: -0.1 m/s, Heat 4: +0.4 m/s, Heat 5: +0.1 m/s

Semifinals
Qualification: First 2 of each heat (Q) and the 2 fastest times (q) qualified for the final.

Wind:Heat 1: +0.9 m/s, Heat 2: +1.3 m/s, Heat 3: -0.1 m/s

Final
The final was held on 21 August at 18:03.

Wind: +1.1 m/s

References

200 metres
200 metres at the World Athletics U20 Championships
U20